Noel Brian Bedford (24 December 1933 – 18 May 2022) was a Welsh professional footballer. He played the majority of his career at Queens Park Rangers, as a centre forward.

Playing career
Bedford started his professional career at Reading, where he was spotted by Ted Bates who signed him for Southampton in July 1955. He made only a handful of appearances for Southampton before moving on to AFC Bournemouth in August 1956.

After scoring 32 goals in 75 games for Bournemouth he was signed by Queens Park Rangers' manager Alec Stock in 1959 for just £750 and made his debut that August in a 2–0 win against Swindon Town. He went on to play 258 league games for Rangers scoring a remarkable 161 goals (180 in all competitions).

He is QPR's second highest goal scorer behind George Goddard. However, despite being a prolific striker, his team never managed to achieve promotion to the Second Division. The closest they managed was a third-place finish in 1960–61 with Bedford scoring an impressive 33 in 44 league games that season.

Bedford was transferred to Scunthorpe United in August 1965 just as a young and dynamic Queens Park Rangers team was taking shape (they cruised to the Third Division title and won the League Cup just two seasons later).

After short spells at Brentford and Scunthorpe United he played briefly in the USA with Atlanta Chiefs. On returning from the U.S. in 1967 however the Football Association banned him from playing as the U.S. Football Association was at the time not affiliated. After a year he successfully appealed the ban and joined Bexley United but a knee injury forced him to retire.

Throughout his career he maintained a high strike rate, scoring 229 goals in 399 league appearances.

Later career
After his retirement from playing he became a professional tennis coach and he was later the stadium manager at Loftus Road, before retiring to Llandaff in 1995.

References

Sources

External links
 Atlanta Chiefs: Brian Bedford

1933 births
2022 deaths
People from Ferndale, Rhondda Cynon Taf
Sportspeople from Rhondda Cynon Taf
Welsh footballers
Association football forwards
National Professional Soccer League (1967) players
AFC Bournemouth players
Brentford F.C. players
Queens Park Rangers F.C. players
Reading F.C. players
Southampton F.C. players
Scunthorpe United F.C. players
Atlanta Chiefs players
Bexley United F.C. players
Queens Park Rangers F.C. non-playing staff
Welsh expatriate footballers
Welsh expatriate sportspeople in the United States
Expatriate soccer players in the United States